Siddipet district is a district located in the northern region of the Indian state of Telangana. Its headquarters is Siddipet. This district contains a part of the Hyderabad Metropolitan Region(Markook Mulugu Wargal) The district shares boundaries with Jangaon, Sircilla, Karimnagar, Kamareddy, Hanamkonda, Yadadri, Medhchal and Medak districts.

Geography 
This district is bounded by Rajanna Sircilla district in the north, Karimnagar district in the northeast, Jangaon district in the east, Yadadri Bhuvanagiri district in the south, Medchal district in the southwest, Medak district in the west and Kamareddy district in the northwest.

District administration 
The collector of Siddipet district is M. Hanmantha Rao, appointed on 16 November 2021, succeeding P. Venkatrami Reddy, who submitted his resignation to join politics.

Administrative divisions 
The district will have three revenue divisions of Gajwel, Siddipet and Husnabad. Venkatarama Reddy is the present collector of the district.

Culture and tourism 
 Sri Vidya Saraswathi Shani Temples, Wargal
 Sri Lakshmi Narasimha Swamy Temple, Nacharam
 Mallanna Swamy Temple, Komuravelli
 Konda pochamma temple, Tigul Narsapur
 Koti Lingeshwara Temple, Siddipet
 Sri Saraswathi Kshetramu Main Temple, Regulapalli
 Sri Lakshmi Narasimha Swamy temple, Bejjanki
 Komati Cheruvu Tankbund, Siddipet
 Ainapur Lake, Telangana
 Komuravelli Mallanna Sagar Reservoir
 Sri Ranganayaka Sagar Reservoir
 Shanigaram Cheruvu, Telangana
 Annapurna Reservoir
 Konda Pochamma Sagar Reservoir, Markook

See also 
 List of districts in Telangana

References

External links 

 Siddipet district
https://indianexpress.com/article/cities/hyderabad/telangana-siddipet-collector-venkatrami-reddy-resigns-to-join-trs-7624928/

 
Districts of Telangana